Jean Bart was a  74-gun ship of the line of the French Navy.

Ship history
The ship was laid down at Lorient on 1 June 1788 from a design by Jacques-Noël Sané, and launched on 7 November 1790. Construction was delayed by lack of materials, and she was not completed until March 1791.

In 1793, she was part of the squadron led by Van Stabel.

She was also part of the Croisière du Grand Hiver winter campaign in 1794/95, serving in Van Stabel's division.

On 15 May 1795, Captain Louis-Marie Le Gouardun took command. Jean Bart was present at the Battle of Genoa in March 1795, and in Cornwallis's Retreat and the subsequent Battle of Groix in June 1795.

In 1800, she sailed to the Mediterranean and made her homeport at Toulon.

On 9 August 1803, Le Gouardun returned as captain, keeping command until 26 May 1808.

In February 1809, she formed part of a French fleet which departed from Brest intending to aid the French colony of Martinique which was under threat from invasion. The fleet sailed for Basque Roads to rendezvous with the Rochefort squadron but upon entering the roadstead they were immediately blockaded by the British. On 26 February 1809, the Jean Bart grounded on a shoal near Île Madame while attempting to enter the anchorage south of Ile d'Aix and was subsequently declared a wreck. In April, the British seized the wreck and burnt the remains.

Replica
A full-scale model is under construction in Gravelines, France.

Notes and references 
 References

 Bibliography
 
  (1671-1870)
 

 External links
 La guerre sur mer pendant la révolution et l'empire. 

Ships of the line of the French Navy
Téméraire-class ships of the line
Ships built in France
1790 ships
Maritime incidents in 1809
Shipwrecks in the Bay of Biscay